Harpalus angustitarsis is a species of ground beetle in the subfamily Harpalinae. It was described by Reitter in 1877.

References

angustitarsis
Beetles described in 1877